Tomas Espedal (born 12 November 1961) is a Norwegian writer. 

Espedal was born in Bergen. He made his literary debut in 1988 with the novel En vill flukt av parfymer. His novel Gå. Eller kunsten å leve et vilt og poetisk liv from 2006 was nominated for the Nordic Council's Literature Prize. He was awarded the Norwegian Critics Prize for Literature for 2009 for his novel Imot kunsten (notatbøkene).

In 2018 he issued the novel Elsken, and he was portrayed in the film Jeg vil bo i mitt navn, directed by Lars Erlend Tubaas Øymo.

Bibliography

 En vill flukt av parfymer. (1988)
 Jeg vil bo i mitt navn. (1990)
 Hun og jeg. (1991)
 Hotel Norge. (1995)
 Blond (erindring). (1996)
 Biografi (glemsel). (1999)
 Dagbok (epitafer). (2003)
 Brev (et forsøk). (2005)
 Gå. Eller kunsten å leve et vilt og poetisk liv. (2006)
 Ly. (2007)
 Imot kunsten. (2009)
 Imot naturen. (2011)
 Bergeners. (2013)
 Mitt privatliv. Liv og kunst. Liv som kunst. (2014)
 Året. (2016)
 Elsken. (2018)

References

1961 births
Writers from Bergen
20th-century Norwegian novelists
21st-century Norwegian novelists
Living people